Coleophora gaylussaciella is a moth of the family Coleophoridae. It is found in North America, including Virginia and Nova Scotia.

The larvae feed on the leaves of Gaylussacia species, including Gaylussacia baccata, as well as Comptonia peregrina. They create a composite leaf case.

References

gaylussaciella
Moths described in 1915
Moths of North America